Federal Council may refer to:

Governmental bodies
 Federal Council of Australasia, a forerunner to the current Commonwealth of Australia
 Federal Council of Austria, the upper house of the Austrian federal parliament
 Federal Council of Germany, the representation of the 16 Federal States of Germany at the federal level
 Federation Council (Russia), the upper house of the Russian federal parliament
 Federal Executive Council (Australia), the formal body holding executive authority under the Australian Constitution
 Federal Financial Institutions Examination Council, a formal inter-agency body of the United States government
 Federal Legislative Council (Malaya), the legislative body of Federation of Malaya
 Federal National Council (United Arab Emirates), the legislature of the United Arab Emirates
 Federal Advisory Council, a body composed of representatives chosen by each of the twelve Federal Reserve Banks that "consults with and advises the Board on all matters within the Board's jurisdiction"
 Federal Salary Council, an advisory body of the executive branch of the United States Government
 Federal Supreme Council (United Arab Emirates), the highest constitutional authority in the United Arab Emirates
 Swiss Federal Council, the federal government of Switzerland
 Syrian Federal Council, a body of the Syrian Federation under the French Mandate

Others
 Democratic Alliance Federal Council, the governing and policy-making body of the Democratic Alliance, the official opposition party in South Africa
 Federal Bar Council, a U.S. lawyers' organization who practice in federal courts within the Second Circuit
 Federal Networking Council, chartered by the US National Science and Technology Council's Committee on Computing, Information and Communications (CCIC) to act as a forum for networking collaborations among US federal agencies

See also
 Central Executive Committee (disambiguation)
 Federation Council (disambiguation)